The Savu Sea (or the Sawu Sea) is a small sea within Indonesia named for the island of Savu (Sawu) on its southern boundary.  It is bounded by Savu and Rai Jua to the south, the islands of Rote and Timor (split between East Timor and Indonesia) to the east, Flores and the Alor archipelago to the north/northwest, and the island of Sumba to the west/northwest. Between these islands, it flows into the Indian Ocean to the south and west, the Flores Sea to the north, and the Banda Sea to the northeast.

It spans about 600 km from west to east, and 200 km from north to south. The largest city on the sea is Kupang, the capital of East Nusa Tenggara province on the island of Timor, with about 450,000 inhabitants.

Extent
The International Hydrographic Organization (IHO) defines the Savu Sea as being one of the waters of the East Indian Archipelago. The IHO defines its limits as follows:
On the North. By the Southern limits of Flores Sea [The North coasts of Flores, Komodo, Banta and a line to Tanjong Naroe the Northeast point of Soembawa, thence along its North coast to Tanjong Sarokaja] and Banda Sea [125° East ... [on] Alor Island, thence round the East point and along the North coasts of the Alor, Pantar, Lomblen and Adoenara Islands and thence across the Northern end of Flores Stait to Tanjong Serbete the Eastern extreme of Flores].
On the East. By the meridian of 125° East between Alor and Timor.
On the South. By a line from the Southwest point of Timor to the Northeast point of Roti, through this island to its Southwest point, thence a line to Poeloe Dana and to Tanjong Ngoendjoe, the Southern extreme of Soemba and through this island to Tanjong Karosso, its Western point.
On the West. A line from Tanjong Karosso (Soemba) to Toro Doro on the South coast of Soembawa.

Bodies of waters within Savu

 Molo Strait – body of waters between Flores and Rinca connects with Savu Sea/Sumba Strait to the south and Flores Sea to the north

References

External links

Seas of Indonesia
Landforms of East Nusa Tenggara
Western Indo-Pacific